Austropeplea ollula is a species of air-breathing freshwater snail, an aquatic pulmonate gastropod mollusk in the family Lymnaeidae, the pond snails.

Distribution 
This species occurs in:

 Korea
 Philippines

Parasites 
In Korea, Austropeplea ollula serves as a first and main intermediate host for the trematode species Echinostoma cinetorchis from the family Echinostomatidae.

Austropeplea ollula also serves as first intermediate host for the fluke Neodiplostomum seoulense in Korea.

References

External links 
 Photo of the shell of Austropeplea ollula
  https://web.archive.org/web/20091222132418/http://www.maff.go.jp/nouson/mizu_midori/frame/208f.html

Lymnaeidae
Gastropods described in 1859